Jos  is a city in the north central  region of Nigeria. The city has a population of about 900,000 residents based on the 2006 census. Popularly called "J-Town", it is the administrative capital and largest city of Plateau State.

During British colonial rule, Jos was an important centre for tin mining and is the trading hub of the state as commercial activities are steadily increasing.

History
The earliest known settlers of the land that would come to be known as Nigeria were the Nok people ( BCE), skilled artisans from around the Jos area who mysteriously vanished in the late first millennium.

According to the historian Sen Luka Gwom Zangabadt, the area known as Jos today was inhabited by indigenous ethnic groups who were mostly farmers. According to Billy J. Dudley, the British colonialists used direct rule for the indigenous ethnic groups on the Jos Plateau since they were not under the Fulani emirates where indirect rule was used. According to the historian Samuel N Nwabara, the Fulani empire controlled most of northern Nigeria, except the Plateau province and the Berom, Mwaghavul, Ngas, Tiv, Jukun and Idoma ethnic groups. It was the discovery of tin by the British that led to the influx of other ethnic groups such as the Hausa from the north, southeastern Igbo, and Yoruba from the country's southwest. As such, Jos is often recognized as a cosmopolitan Nigerian city.

According to the white paper of the commission of inquiry into the 1894 crisis, Ames, a British colonial administrator, said that the original name for Jos was Gwosh in the Izere language (spoken by the Afusari, the first settlers in the area), which was a village situated at the current site of the city; according to Ames, the Hausa, who arrived there after, wrongly pronounced Gwosh as "Jos" and it stuck. Another version was that "Jos" came from the word "Jasad" meaning body in Arabic. To distinguish it from the hill tops, it was called "Jas", which was mis-pronounced by the British as "Jos". It grew rapidly after the British discovered vast tin deposits in the vicinity. Both tin and columbite were extensively mined in the area up until the 1960s. They were transported by railway to both Port Harcourt and Lagos on the coast, then exported from those ports. Jos is still often referred to as "Tin City". It was made capital of Benue-Plateau State in 1967, and became the capital of the new Plateau State in 1975.
Jos has become an important national administrative, commercial, and tourist centre. Tin mining has led to the influx of migrants (mostly Igbos, Yorubas and Europeans) who constitute more than half of the population of Jos. This "melting pot" of race, ethnicity and religion makes Jos one of the most cosmopolitan cities in Nigeria. For this reason, Plateau State is known in Nigeria as the "home of peace and tourism".

Excellent footage of Jos in 1936 including the tin mines, local people and the colonial population is held by the Cinema Museum in London ref HM0172.

Administrative divisions

The city is divided into 3 local government areas of Jos north, Jos south and Jos east. The city proper lies between Jos north and Jos south. Jos east houses the prestigious National Center For Remote Sensing. Jos north is the state capital and the area where most commercial activities of the state takes place, although due to the recent communal clashes a lot of commercial activities are shifting to Jos south. The Governor's office is located in an area in Jos North called "Jise" in Berom language, "Gise" in Afizere (Jarawa) language or "Tudun-Wada" in Hausa language. Jos North has a significant slum.

Jos south is the seat of the Deputy Governor i.e. the old Government House in Rayfield and the industrial centre of Plateau State due to the presence of industries like the NASCO group, Standard Biscuits, Grand Cereals and Oil Mills, Zuma steel west Africa, aluminium roofing industries, Jos International Breweries among others. Jos south also houses prestigious institutions like the National Institute of Policy and Strategic Studies (NIPSS), the highest academic awarding institution in Nigeria, the National Veterinary Research Institute, the Police Staff College, the NTA television college and the Nigerian Film Corporation. Jos north is the location of the University of Jos and its teaching hospital. The city has formed an agglomeration with the town of Bukuru to form the Jos-Bukuru metropolis (JBM). Jos also is the seat of the famous national Veterinary Research Institute (NVRI), situated in Vom.

Geography and climate
The city is served by Yakubu Gowon Airport, but its rail connections no longer operate as the only currently operational section of Nigeria's rail network is the western line from Lagos to Kano.

Hail sometimes falls during the rainy season because of the cooler temperatures at high altitudes. These cooler temperatures have, from colonial times until the present day, made Jos a favourite holiday location for both tourists and expatriates based in Nigeria.

According to the Köppen climate classification system, Jos has a tropical savanna climate, abbreviated Aw.

Features

Jos Wildlife Park

The park has become a home to various species of wildlife including Lions, Rock pythons, marabou storks, Baboons, Honey Badgers, Camels as well as variant flora. 

Jos Museum
The National Museum in Jos was founded in 1952 by Bernard Fagg, and was recognized as one of the best in the country. It has unfortunately been left to fall to ruin as is the case with most of the cultural establishments in Nigeria. The Pottery Hall is also a part of the museum that has an exceptional collection of finely crafted pottery from all over Nigeria and boasts some fine specimens of Nok terracotta heads and artifacts dating from 500 BCE to 200 CE. It also incorporates the Museum of Traditional Nigerian Architecture with life-size replicas of a variety of buildings, from the walls of Kano and the Mosque at Zaria to a Tiv village. Articles of interest from colonial times relating to the railway and tin mining can also be found on display. A School for Museum Technicians is attached to the museum, established with the help of UNESCO. The Jos Museum is also located beside the zoo.

Jos Stadium
A 40,000 seat capacity located along Farin-Gada road which has become home to the Plateau United Football Club, Current champions of The Nigerian Professional League. The stadium has undergone major renovations under the administration of the current governor Barr Simon Bako Lalong.

Jos Golf Course
The golf course located in Rayfield, Jos has hosted many golfing competitions with players coming from both within and outside the state.

Other local enterprises include food processing, beer brewing, and the manufacture of cosmetics, soap, rope, jute bags, and furniture. Heavy industry produces cement and asbestos cement, crushed stone, rolled steel, and tire retreads. Jos is also a centre for the construction industry, and has several printing and publishing firms. The Jos-Bukuru dam and reservoir on the Shen River provide water for the city's industries.

Jos is a base for exploring Plateau State. The Shere Hills, seen to the east of Jos, offer a prime view of the city below. Assop Falls is a small waterfall which makes a picnic spot on a drive from Jos to Abuja. Riyom Rock is a dramatic and photogenic pile of rocks balanced precariously on top of one another, with one resembling a clown's hat, observable from the main Jos-Akwanga road.

The city is home to the University of Jos (founded in 1975), St Luke's Cathedral, an airport and a railway station. Jos is served by several teaching hospitals including Bingham University Teaching Hospital and Jos University Teaching Hospital (JUTH), a federal government-funded referral hospital. The Nigerian College of Accountancy, with over 3,000 students in 2011, is based in Kwall, Plateau State.

Notable people

Mabo Ismaila, Former coach of the female National Football Team, the Super Falcons
Segun Odegbami, Nigerian footballer spent his childhood years in Jos
Desmond Elliot, Nigerian actor, director and Member of the Lagos State House of Assembly
Ahmed Musa, Nigerian footballer was born in Jos
Aisha Salaudeen, Nigerian journalist was born and raised in Jos
Faith Teyei Afan Nigerian Fashion designer was born and raised in Jos
Bez (musician), Nigerian alternative soul singer was born and raised in Jos
Doug Kazé, Nigerian alternative Afro-soul musician was born and raised in Jos
Mikel John Obi, international footballer spent his childhood years in Jos
Ogenyi Onazi, international footballer was born in Jos
Sunday Mba, international footballer had his childhood years in Jos
Joseph Akpala, international footballer was born in Jos
Benedict Akwuegbu, international footballer had his childhood years in Jos
Chibuzor Okonkwo, international footballer was born in Jos
Ice Prince, Nigerian musical artist grew up in Jos
Dayo Okeniyi, actor was born in Jos
M.I, rapper born and raised in Jos
Saint Obi, veteran Nollywood actor kicked off his career in Jos
P-Square, R&B duo of identical twin brothers Peter Okoye and Paul Okoye were born and raised in Jos and now known as Rude-Boi and Mr P as they are no longer duo but individual singers/musicians.
Innocent 'Tuface' Idibia Nigerian multi-award-winning musician was born in Jos
Deborah Enilo Ajakaiye (born 1940), Nigerian geophysicist
Sarah Ladipo Manyika (born 7 March 1968), British-Nigerian writer, spent much of her childhood in Lagos and Jos
Tony Elumelu was born in Jos, Plateau State, Nigeria, in 1963. He hails from Onicha-Ukwu in Aniocha North Local Government Area of Delta State.
Kenneth Gyang, filmmaker that was born in Barkin Ladi of Plateau State, Nigeria.
John Major, former British Prime Minister, worked in the town from 1966 to 1967.

See also

Railway stations in Nigeria

References

External links

Hiking around the hills of Jos

 
Cities in Nigeria
Populated places established in 1915
Populated places in Plateau State
State capitals in Nigeria